Tide Pods (stylized Tide PODS) are a line of laundry detergent pods from Procter & Gamble under the Tide brand. The pods gained notoriety starting in 2017 when social media sites began to show people intentionally eating them.

History 

Procter & Gamble originally created laundry pods when they launched Salvo powder detergent tablets, later disappearing from the market in 1978.

In 2012, Procter & Gamble launched Tide Pods.

Consumption 

Concern has been raised over children accidentally consuming Tide Pods, as its appearance and packaging design can have the same appeal to a child as hard candy with patterned designs, and as Tide Pods are inedible despite tasting like coriander to some people, it is dangerous.
In 2012, in response to a child swallowing Tide Pods, Procter & Gamble said they would make this product more difficult to open by adding a double latch to the lid, and have also re-focused their advertising to make clear the product should be out of a child's reach at all times. The packaging was also changed to an opaque orange rather than the original clear plastic gumball machine-type presentation to make them look less enticing.

Ingestion of pods can lead to death in some cases.

"Tide Pod Challenge" 

Beginning in late 2017 a viral Internet trend, called the "Tide Pod Challenge", emerged on Twitter and various other social media websites, in which participants intentionally ingest detergent pods. Several children and teens have been injured, some severely, from this intentional consumption. The challenge (and subsequent meme) were popularized on Twitter and several people have eaten Tide Pods on camera. One company began making edible replica "pods" and several internet personalities have posted about making edible "Tide Pods".

Tide later partnered with American football player Rob Gronkowski, having him issue the message: "What the heck is going on, people? Use Tide Pods for washing. Not eating. Do not eat."

References 

Laundry detergents